The 1986 Master Bologna was a men's tennis tournament played on outdoor clay courts in Bologna, Italy that was part of the 1986 Nabisco Grand Prix circuit. It was the second edition of the tournament and was played from 9 June until 15 June 1986. First-seeded Martín Jaite won the singles title.

Finals

Singles
 Martín Jaite defeated  Paolo Canè 6–2, 4–6, 6–4
 It was Jaite's 1st singles title of the year and the 2nd of his career.

Doubles
 Paolo Canè /  Simone Colombo defeated  Claudio Panatta /  Blaine Willenborg 6–1, 6–2

References

External links
 ITF tournament edition details

Bologna Outdoor
Bologna
1986 in Italian tennis